was a professional wrestling event promoted by World Wonder Ring Stardom. It took place on October 3, 2020 in Yokohama, Japan, at the Yokohama Budokan with a limited attendance due in part to the ongoing COVID-19 pandemic at the time.

Storylines
The show featured eight professional wrestling matches that resulted from scripted storylines, where wrestlers portrayed villains, heroes, or less distinguishable characters in the scripted events that built tension and culminated in a wrestling match or series of matches.

Event
The second match presented Mina Shirakawa, as the first mystery debutand of the night, coming from Tokyo Joshi Pro Wrestling who picked up a victory against Hanan. The fourth match had Death Yama-san facing the second mystery opponent of the show who was later revealed to be a returning Natsumi Maki who started competing as Natsupoi following her departure from TJPW. After her victory against Yama-san, she joined Giulia's unit of Donna Del Mondo. The sixth match featured Tokyo Cyber Squad's disbanding after Jungle Kyona and Konami fell short to Oedo Tai's Natsuko Tora and Saki Kashima. Kyona, Rina, Ruaka and Death Yama-san received invitations for joining the Stars stable leaded by Mayu Iwatani which the latters accepted. Only Konami left for Oedo Tai. The disbanding of TCS (often shortened from Tokyo Cyber Sqyad) had been done for mourning the late ex-leader of the unit, Hana Kimura.

The main event of the show portraited Mayu Iwatani battling Syuri for the World of Stardom Championship, match which ended with Iwatani's victory, marking her fourth successful title defense in a row.

Results

References

External links
Page Stardom World

2020 in professional wrestling
Women's professional wrestling shows
World Wonder Ring Stardom shows
World Wonder Ring Stardom
Events in Yokohama
Professional wrestling in Yokohama